Chaos Rules: Live at the Trocadero is a live album by the punk band The Dead Milkmen. It was released by Restless Records on November 8, 1994.  

Chaos Rules does not include any songs from either Soul Rotation or Not Richard, But Dick, as the group could not work out a deal with Hollywood Records, their former record label.

Venue
The album was recorded at the Trocadero Theatre, in the band's hometown of Philadelphia.  The Trocadero also served as the venue for the Dead Milkmen's first reunion show, in 2004, performed in honor of their late bass player, Dave Schulthise.

Critical reception
AllMusic wrote that the songs "document the group's prime period, even if these versions don't quite compare to the originals." Trouser Press called the album "a slapdash greatest-hits concert record," writing that "most of the renditions are surprisingly worse than the originals."

Track listing
All tracks by Dead Milkmen

"Tiny Town"
"I Walk the Thinnest Line"
"Smokin' Banana Peels"
"Surfin' Cow"
"Bitchin' Camaro"
"Where The Tarantula Lives"
"Nutrition"
"Big Lizard"
"The Thing That Only Eats Hippies"
"I Hate You, I Love You"
"Lucky"
"V.F.W."
"Punk Rock Girl"
"Rastabilly"
"Stuart"
"Right Wing Pigeons"
"Tacoland"
"Laundromat Song"
"Swordfish"
"If I Had a Gun"

Personnel 
Rodney Anonymous - keyboards, vocals
Dave Blood – bass
Dean Clean – drums
Joe Jack Talcum – guitar, vocals

References

The Dead Milkmen albums
1994 live albums
Restless Records albums